Warrington Borough Council is the local authority of Warrington, Cheshire, England. It is a unitary authority, having the powers of a non-metropolitan county and district council combined. It provides a full range of local government services including Council Tax billing, libraries, social services, processing planning applications, waste collection and disposal, and it is a local education authority. Within Warrington Borough are parts of the historic counties of both Lancashire and Cheshire.

Powers and functions 
The local authority derives its powers and functions from the Local Government Act 1972 and subsequent legislation. For the purposes of local government, Warrington is within a non-metropolitan area of England. As a unitary authority, Warrington Borough Council has the powers and functions of both a non-metropolitan county and district council combined. In its capacity as a district council it is a billing authority collecting Council Tax and business rates, it processes local planning applications, it is responsible for housing, waste collection and environmental health. In its capacity as a county council it is a local education authority, responsible for social services, libraries and waste disposal.

Political control

The Labour Party has held a majority of the seats on the council since 2011. The leader of the council since December 2018 has been Russ Bowden of Labour. The next election is due in 2024.

Investments 
Elected members have approved a number of significant commercial investments by the local authority.  In September 2016, Warrington Borough Council became one of the first local councils in the UK to buy clean-tech bonds in Swindon Solar Park through its owner, specialist investment management firm Rockfire Capital.

In September 2019, the council acquired a 50% shareholding in Clydebank-based energy retailer Together Energy for £18m. In September 2020, Bristol Energy's brand and residential accounts – 155,000 meter points – were sold by Bristol City Council to Together Energy for £14 million. In August 2021, Warrington Council's total financial exposure to Together Energy was reported to be £41.2m. In October 2021, Ofgem issued a provisional order to several suppliers, including Together Energy, who had not made Renewables Obligation payments; Together Energy's obligation was over £12m. Following sharp increases in wholesale gas and electricity prices which began in autumn 2021, Together Energy Retail Ltd announced on 18 January 2022 that it was ceasing to trade.

Other loans and investments include almost £30 million paid in stages between 2017 and 2019 for a 33% stake in Redwood Bank, a "challenger bank" which has a Warrington office. In 2021 a £202m loan facility, secured against commercial property, was provided to Matt Moulding, founder of Cheshire-based e-commerce business The Hut Group.

In September 2021, the council confirmed that its borrowing had reached £1.7 billion, but that the current value of its investment assets were £2.173 billion.

References 

Unitary authority councils of England
Local education authorities in England
Local authorities in Cheshire
Leader and cabinet executives
Billing authorities in England
Warrington